ORIX Corporation USA (ORIX USA) is a financial services group established in 1981 in New York City, New York.  The company’s executive center is in New York City and its operations and investment center is in Dallas.

ORIX USA and its subsidiaries — Boston Financial Investment Management, ORIX Real Estate Capital (the combined company of RED Capital Group, Lancaster Pollard, and Hunt Real Estate Capital), NXT Capital, RB Capital and ORIX Capital Partners—include a team of approximately 1,200 employees spanning more than 35 offices across the U.S. and Brazil.

ORIX USA businesses

Real estate
ORIX Real Estate Capital (OREC), which includes the Lancaster Pollard, RED Capital Group, and Hunt Real Estate Capital brands, provides specialized capital solutions for multifamily, affordable, seniors and health care real estate together with its affiliated companies. OREC is a subsidiary of ORIX Corporation USA.

ORIX Municipal and Infrastructure Finance makes investments of approximately $10 million to $50 million in public, semipublic and private entities. The team’s investment portfolio includes transactions in a wide range of industries, including healthcare, housing, education, energy and transportation.

ORIX Real Estate Holdings is a fully integrated commercial real estate finance, asset management and investment company. It provides a wide variety of loans and securities backed by both traditional and specialized property types, including self-storage, hospitality, healthcare and more.

Corporate credit
Mariner Leveraged Credit invests in and manages loans through CLOs with a strategy focused on broadly syndicated U.S. bank loan leveraged loan market. Currently seven CLO’s issued with inventory of managed loans on ORIX balance sheet.

ORIX Growth Capital specializes in designing customized financing solutions for high-growth companies, with investments starting around $5 million and growing to $50 million. The team has committed over $1.4 billion to more than 125 companies since its inception.

Equity
ORIX Capital Partners is a private equity firm focused on making direct equity investments in established middle-market companies throughout the United States. The company provides patient capital and partners with management teams to support growth and achieve long-term value.

Boston Financial Investment Management In July 2016, ORIX USA acquired Boston Financial Investment Management LP (Boston Financial). The acquisition combined the financial strength and innovative capital solutions of ORIX USA with Boston Financial’s 47-year history and track record as one of the largest syndicators in the Low Income Housing Tax Credit (LIHTC) industry.

ORIX Private Equity Solutions expands alternatives for lower-mid to middle-market companies throughout North America by offering standalone equity investments (control and non-control), flexible mezzanine capital, or a combination of the two strategies. Investments are predominantly with independent sponsors and also include investments with funded equity sponsors, family offices, and directly with entrepreneurs and management teams. Typical investments are in the $10 million to $20 million range.

Americas
ORIX Americas provides direct equity and debt investments to support growth and performance among proven, market-leading companies in Latin America. 

RB Capital In December 2016, ORIX USA acquired a controlling interest in RB Capital Empreendimentos S.A. (RB Capital), a Brazilian capital markets and asset management platform. Founded in 1999, RB Capital is a leading independent capital markets and asset management platform that provides innovative capital and investment solutions focused in real estate, infrastructure and private credit. Based in Sao Paulo, Brazil, the firm has a highly regarded brand, successful track record, and premier customer and investor base.

References

Financial services companies of the United States